is a railway station in the city of Gosen, Niigata, Japan, operated by East Japan Railway Company (JR East).

Lines

Station layout
The station consists of a single ground-level side platform serving one bi-directional track. The station is unattended.

History

The station opened on 1 November 1961. With the privatization of Japanese National Railways (JNR) on 1 April 1987, the station came under the control of JR East. A new station building was completed in April 2014.

Surrounding area

 Sakihana Onsen

External links

 JR East station information 

Railway stations in Niigata Prefecture
Ban'etsu West Line
Railway stations in Japan opened in 1961
Gosen, Niigata